SonicParanoid is an algorithm for the de-novo prediction of orthologous genes among multiple species. It borrows the main idea from InParanoid with substantial changes to the algorithm that drastically reduce the time required for the analysis. Additionally, SonicParanoid generates groups of orthologous genes shared among the input proteomes using single-linkage hierarchical clustering or markov clustering.

References

External links 
SonicParanoid WebPage
Python Package
Source code on GitLab

Genetics databases